Rita Süssmuth (née Kickuth; ; born 17 February 1937) is a German politician of the Christian Democratic Union (CDU). She served as the 10th President of the Bundestag.

From 1985 to 1988, she served as Federal Minister for Youth, Family and Health (from 1986 youth, family, women and health) and from 1988 to 1998 as President of the German Bundestag. With close to 10 years, her tenure was the third longest in the history of the Bundestag. Only Eugen Gerstenmaier and Norbert Lammert held the position longer.

In addition to her political work, Süssmuth was President of the European Movement Germany (1994–1998) and member of the Advisory Board and Board of Trustees of the Bertelsmann Foundation (1997–2007).

Early life and education
Süssmuth was born and spent her childhood in Wadersloh. After graduating from high school (Emsland-Gymnasium) in Rheine in 1956, she completed a degree in Romance studies and history in Münster, Tübingen and Paris, which she finished on 20 July 1961 with the first state examination (Staatsexamen) for teaching. This was followed by postgraduate studies in educational science, sociology and psychology.

In 1964, she then received her Ph.D. phil. at the University of Münster. Her dissertation was titled "Studies on the Anthropology of the Child in contemporary French literature" ("Studien zur Anthropologie des Kindes in der französischen Literatur der Gegenwart").

Süssmuth graduated as a Doctor of Philosophy from the University of Münster in 1964. From 1966 until 1982, she was a faculty member in education at University of Dortmund, Ruhr University, and their predecessor institutions.

Career

Early career 

From 1963 to 1966, Süssmuth worked as a scientific assistant at the universities of Stuttgart and Osnabrück and from 1966 as a lecturer at the Pädagogische Hochschule Ruhr. From 1969 to 1982, she had a teaching assignment at the Ruhr-Universität Bochum for International Comparative Education.

In 1971, Süssmuth was appointed professor of Educational Science at the Pädagogische Hochschule Ruhr. In 1973, she accepted the call of the University of Dortmund. In 1971, she also began working on the scientific advisory board of the Federal Ministry of Family Affairs.

From 1982 to 1985, Süssmuth was the director of the Institut Frau und Gesellschaft in Hanover. During her time as an active politician, she gave block seminars at the University of Göttingen.

Political career
From 1985 to 1988, Süssmuth was Federal Minister of Family Affairs, Senior Citizens, Women and Youth under Chancellor Helmut Kohl. In late 1989, she joined forces with Lothar Späth, Heiner Geißler, Kurt Biedenkopf and others in an unsuccessful effort to oust Kohl as CDU chairman.

Süssmuth was a member of the German Bundestag from 1987 to 2002. In the federal elections in 1987, 1990 and 1994 she won the direct mandate in the constituency of Göttingen and in 1998, she moved into parliament via the state list of the CDU Lower Saxony.

After the resignation of Philipp Jenninger in 1988 Süssmuth became the 10th President of the Bundestag. She held the post until 1998, when the SPD became the strongest group in parliament.

Her tenure saw the German reunification.

In December 1989, Süssmuth advocated a joint declaration by both German states on the recognition of the Polish western border.

From 1986 to 2001, Süssmuth served as president of the Frauen Union (the organization of the female members of the CDU) and therefore had a strong influence in her party.

Political positions
Süssmuth is a supporter of the Campaign for the Establishment of a United Nations Parliamentary Assembly, an organisation which advocates for democratic reformation of the United Nations.

Ahead of the Christian Democrats’ leadership election in 2021, Süssmuth publicly endorsed Armin Laschet to succeed Annegret Kramp-Karrenbauer as the party’s chair.

Life after politics

In September 2000, Federal Minister of the Interior Otto Schily appointed Süssmuth as head of a high-profile bipartisan commission to overhaul Germany's immigration policies. The commission's task was to develop an overall concept for new immigration legislature. The results of the committee were presented in July 2001, in the form of a 323-paged report titled "Crafting Immigration - Promoting Integration" ("Zuwanderung gestalten - Integration fördern").

In 2002, Süssmuth became a member of the Limbach Kommission, which acts as a mediator in questions of Nazi looted art.

On 6 September 2005, Süssmuth was appointed as the new President of the state-approved Berlin OTA Private University (OTA Hochschule), today SRH Hochschule Berlin. She was succeeded by Peter Eichhorn in January 2010.

After leaving politics, Süssmuth has als been involved in a number of philanthropic and business activities, including the following: 
 UNAIDS High Level Commission on HIV Prevention, Co-Chair (since 2010)
 Technical University of Berlin, Chairwoman of the Board of Trustees (since 2010)
 European Policy Centre (EPC), Member of the Strategic Council
 Global Commission on International Migration, Member (2003–2005)
 Migration Policy Institute (MPI), Member of the Board of Trustees
 Heinz Galinski Foundation, Member of the Board of Trustees
 Deutsche Initiative für den Nahen Osten (DINO), Member of the Board of Trustees
 Gegen Vergessen – Für Demokratie, Chairwoman of the Advisory Board
 Genshagener Kreis, Member of the Board of Trustees
 German Foundation for World Population (DSW), Member of the Advisory Board
 Til Schweiger Foundation, Member of the Advisory Board 
 Total E-Quality initiative, Member of the Board of Trustees
 United Nations Association of Germany (DGVN), Member of the Presidium
 Bertelsmann Foundation, Member of the Board of Trustees (1997–2015)
 EnBW, Member of the Advisory Board (2004–2009)
 German Council on Foreign Relations (DGAP), Honorary Member
 TDU-Hochschulkonsortium, President

Süssmuth is also Member of the European Council on Tolerance and Reconciliation established in 2008 to monitor tolerance in Europe and prepare recommendations to European governments and IGOs on fighting xenophobia and anti-semitism.

In 2018 Süssmuth was awarded the Mercator Visiting Professorship for Political Management at the Universität Essen-Duisburg's NRW School of Governance.

Awards and recognitions 

 1988 –  Selected as Frau des Jahres 1987 by Deutscher Staatsbürgerinnen-Verband
 1988 – Bambi
 1989 – Leibniz-Medaille der Akademie der Wissenschaften und der Literatur Mainz
 1990 – Großkreuz des Verdienstordens der Bundesrepublik Deutschland
 1997 – Avicenna-Gold-Medaille der UNESCO
 1997 – Frankfurter Walter-Dirks-Preis
 2004 – Kompassnadel des Schwulen Netzwerks NRW (für ihren Einsatz für die AIDS-Prävention bes. im Schwulen Bereich)
 2006 – Magnus Hirschfeld Medal for Sexual Reform (2006)
 2007 – Theodor-Heuss-Preis (zusammen mit Mustafa Cerić)
 2007 – Niedersächsische Landesmedaille
 2007 – Goldenes Lot, Ehrung des Verbandes Deutscher Vermessungsingenieure
 2007 – Reminders Day Award (2007) for her great commitment to the fight against AIDS
 2008 – Viadrina-Preis der Europa-Universität Viadrina Frankfurt (Oder)
 2010 – Ehrensiegel der Gemeinde Wadersloh
 2011 – Verdienstorden des Landes Nordrhein-Westfalen
 2012 – Adam-Mickiewicz-Preis für Verdienste um die deutsch-französisch-polnische Zusammenarbeit (Weimarer Dreieck)
 2013 – Edith-Stein-Preis
 2014 – Leibniz-Ring-Hannover
 2015 – Reinhard-Mohn-Preis
 2015 – Winfried-Preis
 2016 – Ehrenmitgliedschaft der Deutsche AIDS-Hilfe
 2016 – Verdienstorden des Landes Brandenburg
 2016 – Dorothea-Schlözer-Medaille der Universität Göttingen
 2018 – Humanismus-Preis
 2019 – Ehrensenatorin der Technischen Universität Berlin
 2019 – Ehrenmitgliedschaft der LSU

Honorary doctorate degrees 

 1988 – Hochschule Hildesheim
 1990 – Ruhr-Universität Bochum
 1994 – Universität Veliko Tarnovo, Bulgarien
 1995 – Universität Temesvar, Rumänien
 1996 – Universität Sorbonne Nouvelle-Paris III, Frankreich
 1998 – Johns-Hopkins-Universität Baltimore, Vereinigte Staaten
 1998 – Ben-Gurion-Universität des Negev Be’er Scheva, Israel
 2002 – Universität Augsburg
 2018 – Universität Rzeszów, Polen

Personal life 
Since 1964, Süssmuth was married to university professor Hans Süssmuth. They have one daughter.

Bibliography 

 1964 Studien zur Anthropologie des Kindes in der französischen Literatur der Gegenwart unter besonderer Berücksichtigung François Mauriacs (Dissertation)
 1980 Zur Anthropologie des Kindes. Untersuchungen und Interpretationen
 1985 Frauen – der Resignation keine Chance
 1987 Aids: Wege aus der Angst
 1987 Frauenlexikon: Traditionen, Fakten, Perspektiven zusammen mit Anneliese Lissner und Karin Walter
 1989 Emma Co-Autorin
 1992 Die planlosen Eliten zusammen mit Peter Glotz (SPD) und Konrad Seitz (Botschafter)
 1997 Eine deutsche Zwischenbilanz: Standpunkte zum Umgang mit unserer Vergangenheit
 2000 Wer nicht kämpft hat schon verloren
 
 2006 Migration und Integration: Testfall für unsere Gesellschaft
 2007 Dennoch: Der Mensch geht vor. Für eine Umkehr in Politik und Gesellschaft
 2007 Bildung als globale Herausforderung. Zwei Statements – ein Gespräch with Hermann Glaser, in: Robertson-von Trotha, Caroline Y. (ed.): Kultur und Gerechtigkeit (= Kulturwissenschaft interdisziplinär/Interdisciplinary Studies on Culture and Society, Vol. 2), Baden-Baden 2007, 
 2015 Das Gift des Politischen. Gedanken und Erinnerungen. Deutscher Taschenbuch Verlag, München  (Rezension in der Annotierten Bibliografie der Politikwissenschaft)

References

Sources 
 Michael F. Feldkamp (ed.), Der Bundestagspräsident. Amt – Funktion – Person. 16. Wahlperiode, München 2007,

External links 
 
 Official biography at Bundestag.de (German, from 2002)
 Interview "Education is a human right" by ERSTE Stiftung (2011) 

1937 births
Living people
Politicians from Wuppertal
People from the Rhine Province
Ministers for children, young people and families
Health ministers of Germany
Women Presidents of the Bundestag
University of Münster alumni
Academic staff of the Technical University of Dortmund
Women federal government ministers of Germany
Grand Crosses 1st class of the Order of Merit of the Federal Republic of Germany
20th-century German women politicians
Members of the Bundestag for Lower Saxony
Members of the Bundestag 2002–2005
Members of the Bundestag 1998–2002
Members of the Bundestag 1994–1998
Members of the Bundestag 1990–1994
Members of the Bundestag 1987–1990
Members of the Bundestag for the Christian Democratic Union of Germany
21st-century German women politicians